Lae District is a district of the Morobe Province of Papua New Guinea.  Its capital is Lae.  The population of the district was 148,934 at the 2011 census.

References

Districts of Papua New Guinea
Morobe Province